Bahasha (film) is a 2018 Tanzanian movie about a public official who seeks redemption after taking bribe. It battles the issue of corruption in our present society. 

The film was nominated at Africa Movie Academy Award for Best Film In African Language in 2018.

Synopsis 
Kitasa had to give up on his dream to be a professional footballer due to an injury. He gets elected by his community as a public officer but soon engages in a corrupt activity disappointing himself and those around him. The movie shows how he deals with the consequences of his actions and his struggle to redeem himself. Can he?

Cast 

 Ayoub Bombwe as Kitasa
 Cathryn Credo as Hidaya
 Godliver Gordian as Zawadi

References 

2018 films
Swahili-language films